Uracil dehydrogenase (uracil oxidase) is an enzyme with systematic name uracil:(acceptor) oxidoreductase. This enzyme catalyses the following chemical reaction

 uracil + acceptor  barbiturate + reduced acceptor

Also oxidizes thymine. The enzyme acts on the hydrated derivative of the substrate.

References

External links 
 

EC 1.1.99